Phoenix Bessemer Football Club was an English association football club based in the large town of Rotherham, South Yorkshire, England.

History 
The club was in origin the works outfit of the Phoenix Bessemer steel company (formerly Messrs Steel, Tozer, and Hampton), spun out of the cricket club, and claimed a foundation date of 1876.  The club may have started playing under Sheffield Rules, although by 1876 they were nearly indistinguishable from the Association Football laws.

The club entered the FA Cup in 1882. Its 8–1 win over Grimsby Town during that seasons FA Cup competition is still its opponents record biggest defeat.

The club's FA Cup appearance seems to be the last of the club in football, as there are no further records of matches.

Colours

The club played in navy blue.

League and cup history

Records 
 Best FA Cup performance: 3rd Round, 1882–83

References 

Defunct football clubs in England
Defunct football clubs in South Yorkshire
Works association football teams in England